The Valley is a 1976 short film made by a then fifteen-year-old Peter Jackson with his friends. It was strongly influenced by the films of Ray Harryhausen. It was filmed silent on a Super 8 camera and was shown on the children's television show Spot On.

Plot
The Valley is about four prospectors who walk into a valley and unwittingly enter a rift in the time/space continuum. As they journey down the valley, one of the prospectors (Ian Middleton) gets taken away by a harpy. Another prospector (Peter Jackson) falls off a cliff. The two remaining (Ken Hammon and Andrew Neal) have to fight and destroy a cyclops. They build a raft, float across a lake, and see a building in ruins. This ruin, unbeknownst to them, is the Beehive building of Wellington city – they have not travelled back in time but ahead into a post-apocalyptic world taken over by mythical beasts.

Cast
Andrew Neal as Prospector #1
Ken Hammon as Prospector #2
Ian Middleton as Prospector #3
Peter Jackson as Prospector #4
Pete O'Herne stars in an unidentified role

References
Peter Jackson: From Prince of Splatter to Lord of the Rings by Ian Pryor
Good Taste Made Bad Taste (Documentary) by Tony Hiles
Recreating the Eighth Wonder: Making King Kong (Documentary) by Michael Pellerin

External links
 

Films directed by Peter Jackson
New Zealand short films
1976 films
Amateur filmmaking
1970s English-language films